Hugh VIII may refer to:

 Hugh VIII of Lusignan (died 1165 or 1171)
 Hugh VIII of La Marche (1259–1303)